The 1946 Northern League was a season of speedway racing in the United Kingdom for Northern British teams in 1946. With a National League in place and no Southern counterpart, it was effectively a second tier.

Four of the six entrants were previously members of National League Division Two before war broke out. Glasgow and Birmingham were new entrants.

Middlesbrough Bears won their first trophy. The Bears only lost four league fixtures and had three riders in the leading averages; Frank Hodgson, Fred Curtis and Will Plant all contributed significantly during the season.

During a fixture on 7 October at Brough Park the Birmingham Brummies Canadian rider Charlie Appleby crashed. A rider had fallen in front and in an effort to avoid the fallen rider, Appleby swerved and hit the machine instead. He was thrown into the air and suffered a fractured skull. He was taken to Newcastle Infirmary but died during the early hours of 8 October.

Northern League Final table

On account of the small number of teams in the league the ACU Cup was run in a league format. Norwich Stars came out on top on points difference.

A.C.U. Cup (Div 2) Final table

Top Five Riders (League only)

See also
List of United Kingdom Speedway League Champions
Knockout Cup (speedway)

References

1946 in speedway
1946 in British motorsport